The Lyle H. Fulton Memorial Bridge is a steel plate girder bridge in Nashville, Tennessee that carries Interstate 65 across the Cumberland River. Between the bridge's completion in 1971 and 2000, the route that the bridge carries was designated as Interstate 265, until I-65 was rerouted onto the bridge, replacing that route.

Description
The segment of I-65 that the bridge is located on is part of a loop of interstate highways that completely encircle downtown Nashville, known locally as the Downtown Loop. The bridge carries six lanes, separated by a jersey barrier, and has no shoulders, unlike the nearby Silliman Evans Bridge on I-24. Directly east of the bridge I-65 splits off into a concurrency with I-24, with the lanes on I-65 splitting off into this interchange less than  beyond the eastern end of the bridge. While I-65 is a north-south route, the bridge is almost directly aligned in an east to west direction. West of the bridge, I-65 gradually curves to the south. In addition to the Cumberland River, the bridge also crosses the Cumberland River Greenway at its western end and a surface street at its eastern end.

History
Work began on the bridge in June 1967. On March 15, 1971 the bridge was opened to traffic, along with the entirety of I-265 to the southwest and a short segment of I-40 west of downtown Nashville. Construction of the bridge cost $2,645,508 (equivalent to $ in ). The bridge was officially dedicated on July 9, 1971 in a ceremony officiated by then-governor Winfield Dunn which partially closed the bridge to traffic. It was named in honor of a state politician who died in 1954 from liver cancer at the age of 31 shortly after receiving the Democratic nomination for state senate. As a result, his brother Richard was elected in his place.

In an effort to relieve traffic congestion on I-24 east of downtown Nashville, I-65 was rerouted from a concurrency with that route to the western freeway loop around downtown Nashville in May 2000, replacing I-265.

References

Bridges completed in 1971
Transportation in Nashville, Tennessee
Bridges on the Interstate Highway System
Interstate 65
Bridges over the Cumberland River
Road bridges in Tennessee
1971 establishments in Tennessee